Chugay District is one of eight districts of the province Sánchez Carrión in Peru.

References